The 2016–17 season was Southend United's 111th year in existence and their second consecutive season in League One. Along with competing in League One, the club participated in the FA Cup, League Cup and Football League Trophy.

The season covers the period from 1 July 2016 to 30 June 2017.

Transfers

Transfers in

Transfers out

Loans in

Loans out

Competitions

Pre-season friendlies

League One

League table

Matches

FA Cup

EFL Cup

EFL Trophy

References

Southend United
Southend United F.C. seasons